Don't Gamble with Love is a 1936 American drama film directed by Dudley Murphy and starring Ann Sothern, Bruce Cabot and Irving Pichel.

Partial cast
 Ann Sothern as Ann Edwards  
 Bruce Cabot as Jerry Edwards  
 Irving Pichel as Rick Collins  
 Ian Keith as John Crane  
 Thurston Hall as Martin Gage   
 Elisabeth Risdon as Grace  
 Phillip Trent as Bob Grant  
 Franklin Pangborn as Salesman

References

Bibliography
 Susan Delson. Dudley Murphy, Hollywood Wild Card. University of Minnesota Press, 2006.

External links
 

1936 films
1936 drama films
American drama films
Films directed by Dudley Murphy
Columbia Pictures films
American black-and-white films
1930s English-language films
1930s American films